Sir David McCowan, 1st Baronet,  (8 December 1860 – 15 May 1937) was a Scottish insurance broker and Scotland international rugby union player. He later became the 49th President of the Scottish Rugby Union.

Rugby Union career

Amateur career

He played for West of Scotland.

Provincial career
He played in the inter-city match for Glasgow District in December 1880. He played for West of Scotland District in February 1881.

International career

He was capped 10 times for Scotland between 1880 and 1884.

Administrative career

He was President of the Scottish Rugby Union for the period 1928 to 1929.

Outside of rugby
He was President of the Glasgow Unionist Association. He was knighted in 1927, and created a baronet in 1934.

References

1860 births
1937 deaths
Baronets in the Baronetage of the United Kingdom
British businesspeople in insurance
Glasgow District (rugby union) players
Knights Bachelor
Presidents of the Scottish Rugby Union
Rugby union players from Ayr
Scotland international rugby union players
Scottish rugby union players
Scottish justices of the peace
West of Scotland District (rugby union) players
West of Scotland FC players
Rugby union forwards